The Paramahaṃsa Upanishad, is one of the 108 Upanishadic Hindu scriptures, written in Sanskrit and is one of the 31 Upanishads attached to the Atharvaveda. It is classified as one of the Sannyasa Upanishads. According to Ramanujacharya, Paramhamsa is one of the forms of Lord Vishnu who imparted vedas to Lord Brahma in the form of Divine Swan as per Vishnu-Sahasranama.

The Upanishad is a discourse between the Hindu god Brahma and sage Narada. Their conversation is centered on the characteristics of Paramahamsa (highest soul) Yogi. The text describes the monk as a Jivanmukta, a liberated soul while alive, and Videhamukta is liberation in afterlife.

The text was likely composed in the centuries preceding the start of common era. It is notable for the use of words Yogin and calling renouncers by that epithet.

Chronology
The century in which Paramahamsa Upanishad was composed is not known. The text is ancient since it is referred to in other ancient text whose dating is better established. These textual references and literary style suggest that this Hindu text was composed before the Asrama Upanishad which is dated to the 3rd-century CE. The German scholar of Upanishads, Sprockhoff, assigns it to be from the last few centuries of the 1st millennium BCE.

Contents
The Upanishad, in its opening and concluding hymns, emphasizes the primacy of infiniteness of the Brahman and the Universe, with the Brahman representing the infinite.  The Upanishad's theme is presented in four hymns as an explanation by Lord Brahma to Narada's query on the aspect of the path of the Paramahamsa Yogis.

Hamsa or divine swan, which is used to highlight the supremacy of the Paramahamsa Yogi, meaning the "illumined one", metaphorically represents the quality of the swan to separate milk from water.

Brahma explains that attaining the stage of Paramahamsa Yogi is an arduous task and such yogis are a rarity. The Paramahamsa yogi is the man of the Vedas, asserts the text, he alone abides in Brahman, the eternally pure Ultimate Reality. This yogi not only renounces his wife, sons, daughters, relatives, friends, but also the sacred thread, all rituals and recitations and the topknot hair tuft. The Paramahamsa has the following characteristics, states the text:

Paramahamsa Yogi is neither opinionated or affected by defamation, or is jealous, not a show off, is humble, and is oblivious to all the human frailties. He is immune to the existence of his body, which he treats as a corpse. He is beyond false pretensions and lives realizing the Brahman.

In chapter 3, the Upanished states that carrying the staff of knowledge gives him the epithet "Ekadandi", as he is a renouncer of all pleasures of the world; in contrast is the person who carries a staff simply as a piece of wood goes through the stages of Maharaurava other hells, prone to worldly comforts and  without knowledge. The one who understands the difference between "staff of knowledge" and "staff of wood", is a Paramahamsa.

See also
Jabala Upanishad
Nirvana Upanishad
Shatyayaniya Upanishad

References

Bibliography

Upanishads